OEB may refer to:
 The Official Encyclopedia of Bridge
 Online Educa Berlin, an annual conference on technology-supported learning 
 Online Egyptological Bibliography
 Ontario Energy Board, which regulates natural gas and electricity utilities in Ontario
 Open eBook, an e-book format
 Open English Bible, a Bible translation
 Operation Engineering Bulletin, a type of Aircraft flight manual
 KOPB-TV or Oregon Educational Broadcasting, a public television station
 Branch County Memorial Airport's FAA location identifier
 Oil Equivalent Barrel, unit of energy released by burning one barrel of crude oil
 Octavia E. Butler, an American science-fiction author